The 2000 Plymouth City Council election was held on 4 May 2000 to elect members of Plymouth City Council in England. This was on the same day as the other local elections. The entire council was up for election and the Conservative Party gained control of the council from the Labour Party.

Overall results

|-
| colspan=2 style="text-align: right; margin-right: 1em" | Total
| style="text-align: right;" | 60
| colspan=5 |
| style="text-align: right;" | 61,643
| style="text-align: right;" |

Ward results

Budshead (3 seats)

Compton (3 seats)

Drake (3 seats)

Efford (3 seats)

Eggbuckland (3 seats)

Estover (3 seats)

Ham (3 seats)

Honicknowle (3 seats)

Keyham (3 seats)

Mount Gould (3 seats)

Plympton Erle (3 seats)

Plympton St Mary (3 seats)

Plymstock Dunstone (3 seats)

Plymstock Radford (3 seats)

Southway (3 seats)

St Budeax (3 seats)

St Peter (3 seats)

x

Stoke (3 seats)

Sutton (3 seats)

Trelawny (3 seats)

References

2000 English local elections
May 2000 events in the United Kingdom
2000
2000s in Devon